Anadi Charan Sahu is an Indian politician from Bharatiya Janata Party. He was a member of 6th Lok Sabha from Berhampur constituency in the 1999 Indian General Election. He was I.P.S. Officer and is Recipient of President’s Police Medal and Distinguished Service Medal.

References

1940 births
India MPs 1999–2004
Bharatiya Janata Party politicians from Odisha
Living people
People from Ganjam district
Lok Sabha members from Odisha
Indian police officers